Triphenylene is an organic compound with the formula (C6H4)3.  A flat polycyclic aromatic hydrocarbon (PAH), it consists of four fused benzene rings. Triphenylene has delocalized 18-π-electron systems based on a planar structure, corresponding to the symmetry group D3h. It is a white or colorless solid.

Preparation
Triphenylene can be isolated from coal tar. It is also be synthesized in various ways. One method is trimerization of benzyne.  Another method involves trapping benzyne with a biphenyl derivative.

Properties 
Triphenylene is more resonance stable than its isomers chrysene, benz[a]anthracene, benzo[c]phenanthrene, and tetracene. For this reason triphenylene resists hydrogenation.

As a disc-shaped, planar molecule, triphenylene has attracted attention as the core of discotic mesogen in liquid crystalline materials.

References

External links 
Polycyclic Aromatic Hydrocarbon Structure Index

Polycyclic aromatic hydrocarbons
Tetracyclic compounds